Splashtop is a family of remote-desktop software and remote support software, developed by Splashtop Inc. Splashtop enables users to remotely access or remotely support computers from desktop and mobile devices. Splashtop enables remote computer access for businesses, IT support and help desks, MSPs, and educational institutions.

Products
Splashtop products offer different modalities of the remote computer access and require an internet connection on both the computers to operate.

Splashtop Business Access 
Remote computer access software for businesses, teams and individuals. Users are able to remotely access their Windows, Mac, and Linux computers from a Windows, Mac, iOS, Android, or Chromebook device.

Splashtop SOS 
Remote support software for IT support and help desks. Users are able to provide on-demand attended support to their clients' computers and mobile devices. To manage and support unattended computers, they must upgrade to the SOS+10 or SOS Unlimited plans.

Splashtop Remote Support 
Remote support and endpoint management software designed for MSPs. MSPs are able to remotely support their internal and client computers and provide users with remote access.

Splashtop Enterprise 
All-in-one remote access and remote support solution for organizations. Organizations are able to give employees remote access to computers and provide remote support for computers and mobile devices.

Splashtop Enterprise for Remote Labs 
All-in-one remote access and remote support solution for educational institutions. Education IT admins are able to deploy, manage, and schedule remote access for students' and faculty members' on-campus lab computers through a centralized console. Flexible grouping and access permissions allow IT admins to give students and instructors access only to the computers they need.

Splashtop On-Prem 
All-in-one self-hosted remote access and remote support solution for organizations. Organizations are able to give employees remote access to computers and provide remote support for computers and mobile devices.

Functionality
Splashtop remote desktop applications map the screen of the mobile device to the screen of the remote computer, so that users can interact with the remote computer. For desktop computers, the keyboard and mouse of the client computer will control the same functions on the server computer.

Where a mobile device controls a desktop computer, Splashtop uses touch-to-click controls and zooms using the pinch gesture. Gestures are used to replace mouse and keyboard controls. For example, a two-finger drag gesture is used to scroll within windows, generally mapping to the mouse wheel controller. Splashtop uses a modified version of the mobile keyboard which includes special keys, such as Ctrl, Alt, and Delete.

Compatibility
The current versions of Splashtop Streamer are available for Microsoft Windows XP and later, as well as for Windows Server versions 2003 and later. Splashtop supports Mac OS X 10.10 (Yosemite) and later versions, and even some Linux distros, such as Ubuntu 16.04, 18.04, and 20.04, CentOS 7 and 8, RHEL 7.3-8.1, and even Raspberry Pi 2 and later.

The Splashtop Personal client application is available for the iPad, iPhone and iPod Touch from the Apple App Store, as well as Android (including Kindle Fire), Windows and Mac, and Chromebook.

Company history
Splashtop Inc. is a privately held software company founded in 2006 and headquartered in Silicon Valley with offices in Amsterdam, Tokyo, Singapore, Hangzhou and Taipei.

The company was founded in 2006 under the name DeviceVM Inc. Its first product, named Splashtop OS, was an ‘instant-on’ Linux-based computing platform. The company partners with OEMs and manufacturers to integrate this technology into personal computers. The company changed its name to Splashtop in 2010.

Splashtop Inc. launched its Splashtop Remote product in August 2010. In 2011, Jin Koh launched Splashtop Japan with the goal of expanding the company's reach in the Japanese market. Koh was able to build strong sales channels and partnerships in Japan, eventually leading to significant growth for Splashtop Japan.

The original Splashtop Remote product was split into multiple products with the release of Splashtop Business in 2013. The original consumer-focused solution was renamed Splashtop Personal. Splashtop Remote Support was announced in 2015 as Splashtop Business for Remote Support and later renamed Splashtop Remote Support. Splashtop On-Demand Support was introduced in 2015.

See also
 Comparison of remote desktop software

References

External links
 

Remote administration software
Remote desktop
Windows remote administration software
MacOS remote administration software